Messier 62 or M62, also known as NGC 6266, is a globular cluster of stars in the south of the equatorial constellation of Ophiuchus. It was discovered in 1771 by Charles Messier, then added to his catalogue eight years later.

It is among the ten most massive and luminous globular clusters in the Milky Way, showing an integrated absolute magnitude of −9.18. It has a projected ellipticity of 0.01, meaning it is essentially spherical. The density profile of its member stars suggests it has not yet undergone core collapse.

The cluster shows at least two distinct populations of stars, which most likely represent two separate episodes of star formation. The second is polluted by materials released by the first. In particular, abundances of helium, carbon, magnesium, aluminium, and sodium differ between these two.

Indications are this is an Oosterhoff type I, or "metal-rich" system. A 2010 study identified 245 variable stars in the cluster's field, of which 209 are RR Lyrae variables, four are Type II Cepheids, 25 are long period variables, and one is an eclipsing binary. The cluster may prove to be the galaxy's richest in terms of RR Lyrae variables. It has six binary millisecond pulsars, including one (COM6266B) that is displaying eclipsing behavior from gas streaming off its companion. There are multiple X-ray sources, including 50 within the half-mass radius. 47 blue straggler candidates have been identified, formed from the merger of two stars in a binary system, and these are preferentially concentrated near the core region.

It is hypothesized that this cluster may be host to an intermediate mass black hole (IMBH) – it is considered well-suited for searching for such an object. A brief study, before 2013, of the proper motion of stars within  of the core did not require an IMBH to explain. However, simulations can not rule out one with a mass of a few thousand . Based upon radial velocity measurements within an arcsecond of the core, Kiselev et al.

Gallery

See also
 List of Messier objects

References and footnotes

External links

 Messier 62, Galactic Globular Clusters Database page
 M62 on willig.net
 

Messier 062
Messier 062
062
Messier 062
?